7th National Assembly may refer to:

 7th National Assembly of France
 7th National Assembly of Laos
 7th National Assembly of Namibia
 7th National Assembly of Nigeria
 7th National Assembly of Pakistan
 7th National Assembly of Serbia
 7th National Assembly of Slovenia